The Hum Award for Best Soap Actor is one of the Hum Awards of Merit presented annually by the Hum Television Network and Entertainment Channel (HTNEC). It is given in honor of an actor who has delivered an outstanding performance of leading role in soap series while working within the television industry. The 1st Hum Awards (for 2012) was held in 2013, Imran Aslam was the first winner of the award for his role in Nikhar Gaye Gulab Sare. Currently, nominees are determined by single transferable vote, within the actors and jury branch of HTNEC; winners are selected by a plurality vote from the entire eligible voting members of the Hum. Multiple nominations for an actor in same category but for different work is eligible.

Since its inception, the award has been awarded to four actors, while Danish Taimoor and Imran Aslam tied for most nominations with each two. As of 2015 ceremony, Danish Taimoor and Imran Aslam are the most recent winners in this category for their roles in Hum Tehray Gunahgaar and Susraal Mera respectively.

Winners and nominees

2010s
 2013 Imran Aslam – Nikhar Gaye Gulab Sare
 2014 Humayun Ashraf – Ishq Hamari Galiyon Mein
 2015 Danish Taimoor – Hum Tehray Gunahgaar
 2016 Sohail Sameer – Sartaj Mera Tu Raaj Mera
 2017 Hammad Farooqui – Haya Ke Daaman Main
 2018 Arslan Asad Butt – Naseebo Jali
 2019 Usama Khan – Sanwari

See also 
 Hum Awards
 Hum Awards pre-show
 List of Hum Awards Ceremonies

References

External links
Official websites
 Hum Awards official website
 Hum Television Network and Entertainment Channel (HTNEC)
 Hum's Channel at YouTube (run by the Hum Television Network and Entertainment Channel)
 Hum Awards at Facebook (run by the Hum Television Network and Entertainment Channel)]

Hum Awards
Hum Award winners
Hum TV
Hum Network Limited